Lord Ochiltree (or Ochiltrie) of Lord Stuart of Ochiltree was a title in the Peerage of Scotland. In 1542 Andrew Stewart, 2nd Lord Avondale (see the Earl Castle Stewart for earlier history of the family) exchanged the lordship of Avondale with Sir James Hamilton for the lordship of Ochiltrie and by Act of Parliament was ordained to be styled Lord Stuart of Ochiltrie. His great-grandson, the third Lord Stuart of Ochiltrie, resigned the feudal barony of Ochiltree and the peerage to his cousin, James Stewart, with the consent of the Crown in 1615. In 1619 he was instead elevated to the Peerage of Ireland as Baron Castle Stewart; see the Earl Castle Stewart for further history of this branch of the family).

James Stewart now became the first or fourth Lord Ochiltrie (or Lord Stewart of Ochiltrie). He was succeeded by his son William, the second or sixth Lord. On his early death in 1675 the lordship became either dormant or extinct.

A branch of the Ochiltree family is introduced at the Swedish House of Lords (Riddarhuset) under the name Stuart. Hans (Johannes) Stuart (d. 1618) obtained a letter of descent in Edinburgh in 1579 and a letter of arms at Holyrood Castle in Edinburgh from King James VI of Scotland in 1585

Lords Ochiltree (1542)
Andrew Stewart, 1st Lord Ochiltree (c. 1505–1548)
Andrew Stewart, 2nd Lord Ochiltree (c. 1521–1591)
Andrew Stuart, 3rd Lord Ochiltree (c. 1560–1629), resigned lordship in 1615 and created Baron Castle Stewart in 1619.
James Stewart, 4th Lord Ochiltree (1595–c. 1658) son of James Stewart, Earl of Arran, made Lord Ochiltree in 1615.
William Stewart, 5th Lord Ochiltree (c. 1659–1675)

See also
Earl Castle Stewart
Lord Methven
Lord Avondale
Lord Colvill of Ochiltree
Ochiltree Castle, East Ayrshire

Notes

References

Further reading
http://www3.dcs.hull.ac.uk/genealogy/royal
Kidd, Charles, Williamson, David (editors). Debrett's Peerage and Baronetage (1990 edition). New York: St Martin's Press, 1990.

Dormant lordships of Parliament
Extinct lordships of Parliament
Noble titles created in 1542